Below are the squads for the 1970 FIFA World Cup final tournament in Mexico. Sweden (6), West Germany (2) and Czechoslovakia (1) had players representing foreign clubs.

Group 1

Mexico

Head coach: Raúl Cárdenas

Soviet Union

Head coach: Gavril Kachalin

Belgium

Head coach: Raymond Goethals

El Salvador

Head coach:  Hernán Carrasco

Group 2

Italy

Head coach: Ferruccio Valcareggi

Sweden

Head coach: Orvar Bergmark

Uruguay

Head coach: Juan Hohberg

Israel

Head coach: Emmanuel Scheffer

Group 3

Brazil

Head coach: Mário Zagallo

England

Head coach: Alf Ramsey

Czechoslovakia

Head coach: Jozef Marko

Romania

Head coach: Angelo Niculescu

Group 4

West Germany

Head coach: Helmut Schön

Peru

Head coach:  Didi

Bulgaria

Head coach: Stefan Bozhkov

Georgi Kamenski was a last-minute replacement for the injured Yordan Filipov

Morocco

Head coach:  Blagoje Vidinić

Note: Only 19 players in Morocco squad.

References
 Planet World Cup website
 weltfussball.de 

FIFA World Cup squads
Squads